This article lists the major power stations located in Shaanxi province.

Non-renewable

Coal, gas and fuel-oil-based

Renewable

Hydroelectric

Conventional

Pumped Storage

References 

Power stations
Shaanxi